Ayr Hospital may refer to:

 University Hospital Ayr, Ayr, Ayrshire, Scotland, UK
 Ayr County Hospital, South Ayrshire, Ayrshire, Scotland, UK
 Ayrshire District Asylum, Ayr, Ayrshire, Scotland UK

See also
 Ayr (disambiguation)
 Ayrshire Hospital (disambiguation)